Phil Minton (born 2 November 1940) is a British avant-garde jazz/free-improvising vocalist and trumpeter.

Minton is a highly dramatic baritone who tends to specialize in literary texts: he has sung lyrics by William Blake with Mike Westbrook's group, Daniil Kharms and Joseph Brodsky with Simon Nabatov, and extracts from James Joyce's Finnegans Wake with his own ensemble. He sings on a Jimi Hendrix tribute album, belting out the lyrics in over-the-top fashion. Between 1987 and 1993 Minton toured Europe, North America, and Russia with Lindsay Cooper's Oh Moscow ensemble.

He is perhaps best known, however, for his completely free-form work, which involves "extended techniques" that can be as unsettling as they can be mesmerising. His vocals often include the sounds of retching, burping, screaming, and gasping, as well as childlike muttering, whining, crying and humming; he also has an ability to distort his vocal cords to produce two notes at once. As the DJ/poet Kenneth Goldsmith has described it,

Minton's most frequent improvising companions are the pianist Veryan Weston and the drummer Roger Turner, but he has worked with most of the improvising musicians in the European scene. Unlike some first-generation free improvisers, he has also become a frequent participant in electroacoustic improvisation.

Discography 
 A Doughnut in Both Hands (Rift, 1981)
 Voice of America with Fred Frith, Bob Ostertag (Rift, 1982)
 Ways with Veryan Weston (ITM, 1987)
 The Berlin Station (FMP, 1988)
 Mouthful of Ecstasy (Les Disques Victo, 1996)
 My Chelsea with Noel Akchote, Lol Coxhill (Rectangle, 1997)
 Two Concerts (FMP, 1998)
 A Doughnut in One Hand (FMP, 1998)
 Apples of Gomorrah with John Butcher (GROB, 2002)
 Mopomoso Solos 2002 with Chris Burn, Lol Coxhill (Emanem, 2004)
 Five Men Singing (Les Disques Victo, 2004)
 Constant Comments with Fred Van Hove (FMR, 2005)
 The Enigma Carols (Recorded, 2005)
 Scatter with Pat Thomas (FMR, 2007)
 Tasting with Sophie Agnel (Another Timbre, 2007)
 Slur (Emanem, 2007)
 No Doughnuts in Hand (Emanem, 2008)
 Midhopestones with Michel Doneda (Another Timbre, 2009)
 Fragments of the Cadastre with Michel Doneda (Another Timbre, 2010)
 Anicca (Dancing Wayang, 2011)
 The Knowledge of Its Own Making with Simon Fell (Huddersfield Contemporary, 2014)
 A Doughnut's End (Fataka, 2015)
 Leandre – Minton (Fou, 2017)
 Say Yes. Till No. (Neos, 2018)
 Ductus Pneumaticus with Torsten Muller (WhirrbooM! 2018)
 Blasphemious Fragments (Rastascan, 2019)

With the Tony Oxley Celebration Orchestra
 The Enchanted Messenger (Soul Note, 1995)

With Mike Westbrook
 Plays for the Record (Transatlantic, 1976)
 Goose Sauce (Original, 1978)
 Mama Chicago (RCA, 1979)
 Bright as Fire (Original, 1980)
 The Paris Album (Polydor, 1981)
 The Cortège (Original, 1982)
 On Duke's Birthday (hat Art, 1985)
 Off Abbey Road (Enja, 1990)

References

External links 

Phil Minton homepage

Phil Minton page on EFI
Phil Minton's Feral Choir
Phil Minton at exclaim
 Duo Phil Minton, Daunik Lazro video on OC-TV.net

1940 births
Avant-garde singers
Living people
English jazz trumpeters
Male trumpeters
Free improvisation
Emanem Records artists
21st-century trumpeters
21st-century British male musicians
British male jazz musicians
Solid Gold Cadillac members
The Orckestra members
Leo Records artists